The lamina is the most peripheral neuropil of the insect visual system. There are twelve distinct neuron classes in the lamina: the lamina monopolar cells L1-L5, two GABAergic feedback neurons (C2 and C3), two wide-field feedback neurons (Lawf1 and Lawf2), lamina intrinsic amacrine neurons (Lai)  and the T1 basket cell. The outer photoreceptors, R1-R6, terminate in the lamina, where they form tetrad synapses with L1, L2, L3, and Lai.

References 

Insect anatomy
Visual perception